Daniel Colin Hollinshead (born 7 June 1995 in New Zealand) is a New Zealand rugby union player who currently plays for Rugby United New York (RUNY) of Major League Rugby (MLR).

His playing position is fly-half. He was named in the Highlanders squad for week 13 in 2019.

Reference list

External links
itsrugby.co.uk profile

1995 births
New Zealand rugby union players
Living people
Rugby union fly-halves
Bay of Plenty rugby union players
SU Agen Lot-et-Garonne players
Coca-Cola Red Sparks players
Highlanders (rugby union) players
Rugby New York players
Auckland rugby union players
Rugby Club Vannes players
Rugby union players from Tauranga